The Ministry of Internal and Foreign Trade of the Republic of Serbia is the ministry in the Government of Serbia which is in the charge of internal and foreign trade. The current minister is Tomislav Momirović of the Serbian Progressive Party.

History
The Ministry was established on 11 February 1991. From 2011 to 2012, it was merged within the Ministry of Agriculture, Trade, Forestry, and Water Economy.

The Ministry was reestablished in 2012, under name Ministry of Internal and Foreign Trade, Telecommunications, and Information Society. It took some of the jurisdictions of the Ministry of Culture, Information, and Informational Society, which were previously under the abolished Ministry of Telecommunications and Information Society.

Sectors
There are several sectors operating within the Ministry:
 Sector for bilateral economic cooperation
 Sector for multilateral and regional economic and trade cooperation
 Sector for trade, services and competition
 Sector for consumer protection
 Sector for market inspection
 Sector for tourism
 Sector for tourist inspection
 Sector for electronic communications and postal traffic
 Sector for information society
 Sector for normative and administrative affairs

Subordinate institutions
There are several agencies and institutions that operate within the scope of the Ministry:
 Tourist Organization of Serbia
 Academic Network of the Republic of Serbia – AMRES

List of ministers
Political Party:

See also
 Ministry of Telecommunications and Information Society (Serbia)
 Tourism in Serbia
 Telecommunications in Serbia

References

External links
 
 Serbian ministries, etc – Rulers.org

Trade, Tourism and Telecommunications
1991 establishments in Serbia
Ministries established in 1991
Serbia
Serbia
Serbia